The Coheelee Creek Covered Bridge near Hilton, Georgia is a covered bridge which was built in 1883.  It was listed on the National Register of Historic Places in 1976.

It was built by J.W. Baughman.  It has two  spans and rests upon three abutments.

See also
List of covered bridges in Georgia

References

Covered bridges in Georgia (U.S. state)
National Register of Historic Places in Early County, Georgia
Bridges completed in 1883